Skre is a surname. Notable people with the surname include:

Arnhild Skre (born 1952), Norwegian newspaper editor, press historian, and biographer
Ivar Heming Skre (1897–1943), Norwegian resistance member

Norwegian-language surnames